Gusiluo (997–1065) was a Tibetan king of Tsongkha, in present-day Qinghai and parts of Hexi Corridor. Claimed to be a descendant of Buddha, Guosiluo laid a foundation to a large Tibetan confederacy centered in Zongge (present-day Ping'an District). The Gusiluo regime built a closed relationship with the Khitans to resist the increasing powerful Western Xia. 
In 1099, the Northern Song launched a campaign into Xining and Haidong (in modern Qinghai province), occupying territory that was controlled by the Tibetan Gusiluo regime since the 10th century.

See also
Pre-Imperial Tibet

References

997 births
1065 deaths
History of Tibet
Tibetan people